Smooth Assassin is the debut studio album by the American rapper Grand Daddy I.U., from Queens, New York. It was released on September 14, 1990, via Cold Chillin' Records. The album was produced by Biz Markie, with Cutmaster Cool V serving as both the co-producer and mixer of the album.

Track listing
All tracks produced by Biz Markie.
"The U Is Smooth" - 5:00 
"Pick Up the Pace" - 4:22 
"Something New" (featuring Desiree Price, Raezia Rolle & Toni Rolle) - 4:49 
"I Kick Ass" - 5:05 
"Mass Destruction" - 3:58 
"Gals dem So Hot" - 4:40 
"Girl in the Mall" - 4:47 
"Kay Cee Is Nasty" - 1:56 
"Nobody Move" - 4:27 
"Dominos" - 4:24 
"Behind Bars" - 4:29 
"Soul Touch" - 4:16 
"This Is a Recording" - 5:12 
"Sugar Free" (featuring Mary Brown) - 5:01 
"Phuck 'Em Up U" - 2:27 
"Shout Outs" - 2:42

Samples
The U Is Smooth
"Hydra" by Grover Washington Jr.

Pick Up the Pace
"Reggins" by The Blackbyrds
"Love Rap" by Spoonie Gee 
Something New
"Papa Was Too" by Joe Tex
"I'm Your Puppet" by James & Bobby Purify
I Kick Ass
"White Lightning (I Mean Moonshine)" by James Brown
"Think (About It)" by Lyn Collins
Mass Destruction
"Storm King" by Bob James
Girl in the Mall
"You Can Call Me Rover" by The Main Ingredient
Kay Cee Is Nasty
"Synthetic Substitution" by Melvin Bliss
"Escape-ism" by James Brown
Nobody Move
"Red Baron" by Billy Cobham
Dominos
"Blues and Pants" by James Brown
"Dominoes" by Donald Byrd
Behind Bars
"Yes We Can Can" by The Pointer Sisters

Soul Touch
"Soul Touch" by Ronnie Mitchell
Sugar Free
"Sugar Free" by Juicy
"Funky President (People It's Bad)" by James Brown
Phuck 'Em Up U
"The Message from the Soul Sisters" by Myra Barnes

References

External links
Smooth Assassin by Grand Daddy I.U. on Bandcamp

1990 debut albums
Grand Daddy I.U. albums
Cold Chillin' Records albums